Following is a list of hospitals within the province of Quebec, Canada.

Bas-Saint-Laurent
Health and social services in this region are covered by the Centre intégré de santé et de services sociaux du Bas-Saint-Laurent (CISSS du Bas-Saint-Laurent). There are currently seven hospitals in the Bas-Saint-Laurent region:
Hôpital régional de Rimouski (Rimouski, Quebec)
Centre hospitalier Trois-Pistoles (Trois-Pistoles, Quebec)
Hôpital d'Amqui (Amqui)
Hôpital Notre-Dame-de-Fatima (La Pocatière)
Hôpital de Matane (Matane)
Centre hospitalier régional du Grand-Portage (Rivière-du-Loup)
Hôpital de Notre-Dame-du-Lac (Témiscouata-sur-le-Lac)
Centre hospitalier de la Mitis (Mont-Joli)

Saguenay–Lac-Saint-Jean
Health and social services in this region are covered by the Centre intégré universitaire de santé et de services sociaux du Saguenay–Lac-Saint-Jean (CIUSSS du Saguenay–Lac-Saint-Jean). There are currently six hospitals in the Saguenay–Lac-Saint-Jean region:
Hôpital de Dolbeau-Mistassini (Dolbeau-Mistassini)
Hôpital de Jonquière (Jonquière)
Hôpital de Roberval (Roberval, Quebec)
Hôpital de Chicoutimi (Chicoutimi)
Hôpital d'Alma (Alma, Quebec)
Hôpital de La Baie (La Baie)

Capitale-Nationale

Health and social services in this region are covered by the Centre intégré universitaire de santé et de services sociaux de la Capitale-Nationale (CIUSSS de la Capitale-Nationale). There are currently thirteen hospitals in the Capitale-Nationale region:
CHU de Québec-Université Laval
Hôpital Saint-François d'Assise
Hôpital de l'Enfant-Jésus
Hôpital du Saint-Sacrement
Hôtel-Dieu de Québec
CHUL et Centre mère-enfant Soleil
Hôpital Sainte-Anne-de-Beaupré (Sainte-Anne-de-Beaupré)
Jeffrey Hale - St Brigid's Hospital
Hôpital de Baie-Saint-Paul (Baie-Saint-Paul)
Hôpital Chauveau (Québec, Quebec)
Hôpital de La Malbaie (La Malbaie)
Hôpital régional de Portneuf (Portneuf, Quebec)
Institut universitaire en santé mentale de Québec
Institut universitaire de cardiologie et de pneumologie de Québec

Mauricie
Health and social services in this region are covered by the Centre intégré universitaire de santé et de services sociaux de la Mauricie-et-du-Centre-du-Québec (CIUSSS-MCQ). There are currently six hospitals in the Mauricie region:
Hôpital du Centre-de-la-Mauricie (Shawinigan)
Hôpital et Centre d'hébergement en santé mentale de la Mauricie-et-du-Centre-du-Québec (Shawinigan)
Centre hospitalier affilié universitaire régional (CHAUR) (Trois-Rivières)
Hôpital Sainte-Croix (Drummondville)
Hôtel-Dieu d’Arthabaska (Victoriaville)
Centre de services du Haut-Saint-Maurice (La Tuque, Quebec)

Estrie
Health and social services in this region are covered by the Centre intégré universitaire de santé et de services sociaux de l'Estrie - Centre hospitalier universitaire de Sherbrooke (CIUSSS de l'Estrie - CHUS). There are currently ten hospitals in the Estrie region:
Centre hospitalier universitaire de Sherbrooke (CHUS)
Hôpital Fleurimont
Hôtel-Dieu de Sherbrooke
Centre de services ambulatoires Saint-Jacques (Granby, Quebec)
Hôpital et centre d'hébergement D'Youville (Sherbrooke)
Hôpital et centre d'hébergement Argyll (Sherbrooke)
Hôpital, CLSC et centre d'hébergement d'Asbestos (Asbestos, Quebec)
Hôpital Brome-Missisquoi-Perkins (Cowansville)
Centre de santé et de services sociaux de la MRC-de-Coaticook (Coaticook)
Centre de santé et services sociaux de Memphrémagog (Magog, Quebec)
Centre de santé et de services sociaux du Granit (Lac-Mégantic, Quebec)

Montreal
Health and social services in this region are covered by five chapters, namely the Centre intégré universitaire de santé et de services sociaux de l'Est-de-l'Île-de-Montréal (CIUSSS de l'Est-de-l'Île-de-Montréal), the Centre intégré universitaire de santé et de services sociaux de l'Ouest-de-l'Île-de-Montréal (CIUSSS de l'Ouest-de-l'Île-de-Montréal), the Centre intégré universitaire de santé et de services sociaux du Centre-Ouest-de-l'Île-de-Montréal (CIUSSS du Centre-Ouest-de-l'Île-de-Montréal), the Centre intégré universitaire de santé et de services sociaux du Centre-Sud-de-l'Île-de-Montréal (CIUSSS du Centre-Sud-de-l'Île-de-Montréal), and the Centre intégré universitaire de santé et de services sociaux du Nord-de-l'Île-de-Montréal (CIUSSS du Nord-de-l'Île-de-Montréal). Some hospitals are also academic centres affiliated with McGill University or the Université de Montréal. There are currently over thirty hospitals in the Montreal region:
CIUSSS de l'Est-de-l'Île-de-Montréal
Hôpital Maisonneuve-Rosemont
Hôpital Santa Cabrini Ospedale
Institut universitaire en santé mentale de Montréal (previously known as Hôpital Louis-H. Lafontaine)

CIUSSS de l'Ouest-de-l'Île-de-Montréal
St. Mary's Hospital
Hôpital de LaSalle
Lakeshore General Hospital
Douglas Mental Health University Institute
CIUSSS du Centre-Ouest-de-l'Île-de-Montréal
Jewish General Hospital
Mount Sinai Hospital Montreal
Hôpital Richardson
Hôpital Catherine Booth
Donald Berman Maimonides Geriatric Centre
CIUSSS du Centre-Sud-de-l'Île-de-Montréal
Hôpital Notre-Dame
Hôpital de Verdun
Montreal Chinese Hospital
Institut universitaire de gériatrie de Montréal
Institut de réadaptation Gingras-Lindsay de Montréal
CIUSSS du Nord-de-l'Île-de-Montréal
Hôpital du Sacré-Cœur de Montréal
Hôpital Jean-Talon
Hôpital Fleury
Hôpital en santé mentale Rivière-des-Prairies
Hôpital en santé mentale Albert-Prévost
McGill University Health Centre (MUHC)
Royal Victoria Hospital
Allan Memorial Institute
Montreal Chest Institute
Montreal General Hospital
Montreal Children's Hospital
Montreal Neurological Institute and Hospital
Hôpital de Lachine
Shriners Hospital for Children
Centre hospitalier de l'Université de Montréal (CHUM)

CHU Sainte-Justine - Centre hospitalier universitaire mère-enfant (affiliated to the Université de Montréal but independent from the Centre hospitalier de l'Université de Montréal)
Centre de réadaptation Marie Enfant
Montreal Heart Institute
Hôpital de réadaptation Villa Medica
Institut Philippe-Pinel de Montréal
Hôpital Sainte-Anne
Hôpital Marie-Clarac

Outaouais
Health and social services in this region are covered by the Centre intégré universitaire de santé et de services sociaux de l'Outaouais (CISSS de l'Outaouais). There are currently seven hospitals in the Outaouais region:
Hôpital de Gatineau
Hôpital de Hull
Hôpital en santé mentale Pierre-Janet 
Hôpital et CHSLD de Papineau (Buckingham, Quebec)
Wakefield Memorial Hospital (Wakefield, Quebec)
Hôpital de Maniwaki (Maniwaki)
Hôpital et CHSLD du Pontiac (Shawville, Quebec)

Abitibi-Témiscamingue
Health and social services in this region are covered by the Centre intégré universitaire de santé et de services sociaux de l'Abitibi-Témiscamingue (CISSS de l'Abitibi-Témiscamingue). There are currently seven hospitals in the Abitibi-Témiscamingue region:
Hôpital d'Amos
Hôpital de La Sarre
Hôpital de Rouyn-Noranda
Hôpital de Ville-Marie
Hôpital de Témiscaming-Kipawa
Hôpital de Val-d'Or
Hôpital en santé mentale de Malartic

Côte-Nord
Health and social services in this region are covered by the Centre intégré de santé et de services sociaux de la Côte-Nord (CISSS de la Côte-Nord). There are currently nine hospitals in the Côte-Nord region:
Centre multiservices de santé et de services sociaux des Escoumins
Centre multiservices de santé et de services sociaux de Forestville
Hôpital Le Royer
Centre multiservices de santé et de services sociaux de Port-Cartier
Hôpital de Sept-Îles
Centre multiservices de santé et de services sociaux de Sept-Îles
Centre multiservices de santé et de services sociaux de la Minganie
Centre multiservices de santé et de services sociaux de la Basse-Côte-Nord
Centre multiservices de santé et de services sociaux de Fermont

Gaspésie–Îles-de-la-Madeleine
Health and social services in this region are covered by the Centre intégré de santé et de services sociaux de la Gaspésie (CISSS de la Gaspésie) and the Centre intégré de santé et de services sociaux des Îles (CISSS des Îles).
CISSS de la Gaspésie
Hôpital de Gaspé
Hôpital de Chandler
Hôpital de Maria
Hôpital de Sainte-Anne-des-Monts
CISSS des Îles
Hôpital de l'Archipel

Chaudière-Appalaches
Health and social services in this region are covered by the Centre intégré de santé et de services sociaux de Chaudière-Appalaches (CISSS de Chaudière-Appalaches). There are currently eight hospitals in the Chaudière-Appalaches region:
Hôtel-Dieu de Lévis
Hôpital de Thetford Mines
Hôpital de Saint-Georges
Hôpital de Montmagny
Hôpital de jour Le Cap
Consultations externes de Lévis - Jean XXIII
Centre Paul-Gilbert - CHSLD de Charny
Centre de services ambulatoires en pédopsychiatrie de Lévis

Laval
Health and social services in this region are covered by the Centre intégré de santé et de services sociaux de Laval (CISSS de Laval). There are currently two hospitals in Laval:
Hôpital de la Cité-de-la-Santé
Jewish Rehabilitation Hospital

Lanaudière
Health and social services in this region are covered by the Centre intégré de santé et de services sociaux de Lanaudière (CISSS de Lanaudière). There are currently two hospitals in the Lanaudière region:
Hôpital Pierre-Le Gardeur (Terrebonne, Quebec)
Centre hospitalier De Lanaudière (Saint-Charles-Borromée, Quebec)

Laurentides
Health and social services in this region are covered by the Centre intégré de santé et de services sociaux des Laurentides (CISSS des Laurentides). There are currently six hospitals in the Laurentides region:
Centre multiservices de santé et de services sociaux d'Argenteuil
Hôpital de Mont-Laurier
Hôpital de Saint-Eustache
Hôpital Laurentien
Hôpital régional de Saint-Jérôme
Centre de services de Rivière-Rouge

Montérégie
Health and social services in this region are covered by the Centre intégré de santé et de services sociaux de la Montérégie-Centre (CISSS de la Montérégie-Centre), Centre intégré de santé et de services sociaux de la Montérégie-Est (CISSS de la Montérégie-Est), and Centre intégré de santé et de services sociaux de la Montérégie-Ouest (CISSS de la Montérégie-Ouest). There are currently nine hospitals in the Montérégie region:
CISSS de la Montérégie-Centre
Hôpital du Haut-Richelieu
Hôpital Charles-LeMoyne
CISSS de la Montérégie-Est
Hôpital Pierre-Boucher
Hôpital Honoré-Mercier
Hôtel-Dieu de Sorel
CISSS de la Montérégie-Ouest
Hôpital du Suroît
Barrie Memorial Hospital
Hôpital Anna-Laberge
Centre Hospitalier Kateri-Memorial Tehsakotitsen : Tha

References

See also

List of hospitals in Canada
CLSC
Administrative regions of Quebec
Healthcare in Canada

 
Quebec
Hospitals